Rahmanuddin (born 13 March 1993) is an Indonesian professional footballer who plays as a goalkeeper for Persiraja Banda Aceh.

Club career
He began his career in 2012 playing for Paraguayan Club Cerro Porteño together with fellow Indonesian Zikri Akbar. Then he played for PSSB Bireuen in Indonesian Premier League and established himself as first choice goalkeeper for the club.

In 2014, he moved to Semen Padang. Beside being back-up goalkeeper for the senior team, he also played for Semen Padang FC U-21, and won the 2014 Indonesia Super League U-21. He played his first game in senior Indonesian Super League for the club in on October 29, 2014 when Semen Padang played a draw 2-2 game with Arema F.C. In 2015, he played for Gresik United, to compete in Liga 1.

He moved to East Timorese Liga Futebol Amadora club Assalam F.C. in 2016, before joining Persiraja Banda Aceh in 2017. In 2018 season, he is considered one of best goalkeeper in Liga 2 by becoming goalkeeper with lowest concedes in the league until fifth week.

International career
Rahmanuddin has not played any international caps. He was selected into Indonesia pre-eliminary squad for 2014 AFF Suzuki Cup, however, he was not chosen for the final squad for the tournament.

Honour

Club Honors
Semen Padang U-21
 Indonesia Super League U-21: 2014

References

External links
 
 Rahmanuddin at Liga Indonesia

Living people
1993 births
Indonesian footballers
Indonesian expatriate footballers
Expatriate footballers in Paraguay
Cerro Porteño players
PSSB Bireuen players
Semen Padang F.C. players
Gresik United players
Persiraja Banda Aceh players
Liga 1 (Indonesia) players
Sportspeople from Aceh
Association football goalkeepers